John Drotsky (born 16 June 1984, in Rehoboth) is a Namibian rugby union scrum-half. He is a member of the Namibia national rugby union team and participated with the squad at the 2007 Rugby World Cup.

References

1984 births
Living people
People from Rehoboth, Namibia
Rugby union scrum-halves
Namibian rugby union players
Namibia international rugby union players